The Cairns Taipans are an Australian professional basketball team based in Cairns, Australia, and play in the National Basketball League. The team was established in 1999, and they play all their regular season games at the Cairns Convention Centre.

The following is a list of all the players, both past and current, who have appeared in at least one game for the club. (Updated 27 June 2022)

2000s

Players

Coaching Staff

2010s

Players

Coaching Staff

2020s

Players

Coaching Staff

References

Cairns Taipans
National Basketball League (Australia)
National Basketball League (Australia) all-time rosters